This is a detailed list of transactions during the 2004-05 NBA season.

Retirement

Front office movements
Cleveland Cavaliers names Danny Ferry general manager (June 27, 2005)
Orlando Magic names Dave Twardzik and Otis Smith assistant general managers and  Alex Martins executive vice president of marketing and franchise relations (June 27, 2005)
Cleveland Cavaliers dismisses president and general manager of basketball operations Jim Paxson (April 1, 2005).

Front office contract extensions
New Jersey Nets sign general manager Ed Stefanski to a contract extension (May 12, 2005).

Head coach changes
Terry Stotts is hired as head coach of the Milwaukee Bucks (July 8, 2005) after Terry Porter was dismissed on June 22.
Dwane Casey is hired as head coach of the Minnesota Timberwolves (June 17, 2005) 
Phil Jackson returns to coach the Los Angeles Lakers (June 14, 2005)
Mike Brown is named assistant coach of the Cleveland Cavaliers (June 2, 2005)
Brian Hill is named head coach of the Orlando Magic (May 24, 2005)
Philadelphia 76ers announce the replacement of Maurice Cheeks for Jim O'Brien as head coach (May 23, 2005)
Avery Johnson was named head coach of the Dallas Mavericks on March 19, 2005.
Johnny Davis is dismissed as head coach of the Orlando Magic (March 17, 2005)

Head coach contract extensions
Chicago Bulls extend Scott Skiles's contract through the 2008-09 NBA season (June 16, 2005)
Houston Rockets head coach Jeff Van Gundy gets a contract extension through the 2007-08 NBA season (May 18, 2005)

Assistant coach changes
Phoenix Suns names Dan D'Antoni assistant coach (June 29, 2005)
Orlando Magic names Randy Ayers and Tom Sterner assistant coaches (June 10, 2005)
Cleveland Cavaliers names Hank Egan assistant coach (June 9, 2005)
New Jersey Nets (now called Brooklyn Nets) names Gordon Chiesa assistant coach (June 9, 2005)
Milwaukee Bucks names Mike Sanders assistant coach (June 7, 2005).
Assistant coach Jim Boylen resigns to become an assistant coach at Michigan State (May 31, 2005)
Cleveland Cavaliers names Mike Bratz and Wes Wilcox assistant coaches (March 24, 2005)

General manager changes

Team president changes

Player movement

Trades

Releases

Free Agency

Draft

First round

Second round

Signed Undrafted Players

References

External links 
 The full detailed list at NBA.com
 NBA Transactions at NBA.com
 2004 Free Agent Tracker at NBA.com
 2004–05 NBA D-League Assignments at NBA.com
 2004-05 NBA Transactions| Basketball-Reference.com

Transactions
2004-05